Bandwagon or band wagon may refer to:

 A vehicle serving as a mobile stage for musicians

Other usages derived from this:

Behaviour
 Bandwagon effect, "copycat" behavior
 Argumentum ad populum, or the bandwagon fallacy: "If many believe so, it is so"
 Bandwagon fan, a person who likes a sport team just because of their recent success
 Bandwagoning, a term in international relations

Arts and entertainment
 The Band Wagon (musical), a 1931 American musical revue
 The Bandwagon, a jazz trio headed by Jason Moran
 Band Wagon (album), a 1975 album by Shigeru Suzuki
 Bandwagon (magazine), an American bimonthly journal of the Circus Historical Society published since 1940
 The Bandwagon (album), a live album by Jason Moran
 Johnny Johnson and the Bandwagon, an American soul group, originally known as The Bandwagon

Film, radio and television
 The Band Wagon, a 1953 MGM movie musical starring Fred Astaire and Cyd Charisse
 Bandwagon (film), a 1996 independent film written and directed by John Schultz
 Bandwagon (U.S. TV series), a local music series on KEYC-TV in Mankato, Minnesota
 Bandwagon (Australian TV series), an Australian television variety series

See also
 Band Waggon, BBC Radio series with Arthur Askey and Richard Murdoch which ran from 1938 to 1940
 Band Waggon (film), 1940 British film based on the radio series starring Askey and Murdoch
 Johnny Johnson and the Bandwagon, a band from the late 1960s and early 1970s
 The Bandwagon Project, a non-profit music therapy project
 Wagon, a heavy four-wheeled vehicle